Keita Suzuki (born July 3, 1981)  is a Japanese professional  basketball player who plays for Tokyo Dime.  He played college basketball for Meiji University. He represented his country for in the Japan national 3x3 team.

References

External links

1981 births
Living people
Japanese men's basketball players
Japan national 3x3 basketball team players
Sportspeople from Kanagawa Prefecture
Forwards (basketball)